Andrei Polgar is a Romanian author and YouTube personality in the realm of economics. His YouTube channel gained mainstream recognition and is frequently mentioned by analysts on MSN, SeekingAlpha, StockTwits, Entrepreneur (magazine), Forbes and other platforms.

Career
His YouTube channel, One Minute Economics, has been launched on November 8, 2015. It features educational animations, approximately one minute in length, on topics ranging from economic theory to case studies of past or current events. One Minute Economics videos are widely used by universities and organizations in the education sphere, for example Open University, The University of Manchester, The Canadian Encyclopedia and the California Council on Economic Education.

His first book, Wealth Management 2.0 (published on July 5, 2016) has received niche recognition.

His second book, The Age of Anomaly (published on January 3, 2018), covers the broader topic of preparing for financial calamities. The Age of Anomaly received extensive coverage and landed on The Wall Street Journal and USA Today bestseller lists in 2018.

References

Living people
Romanian writers
Year of birth missing (living people)